Aspidiphorus is a genus of beetles belonging to the family Sphindidae.

The genus was first described by Ziegler in 1821.

Species:

References

Sphindidae